Sin is the fifth studio recording from Mother Superior and the first of two to be produced by MC5 legend Wayne Kramer.

Track listing 
"Strange Change" – 4:26    
"Talk to the Future" – 4:44   
"Pretty in the Morning" – 3:16 
"Jaded Little Princess" – 2:31    
"Spinnin'" – 5:09 
"Rollin Boy Blues" – 3:24   
"Aint Afraid of Dying" – 3:46   
"Fool Around" – 5:03   
"Downtown Toms Medicine #2" – 3:40
"Rocks" – 3:18
"Fade Out, Wounded Animal" – 12:39

Personnel 
 Jim Wilson – vocals, guitars
 Marcus Blake – bass
 Jason Mackenroth – drums

Mother Superior (band) albums
2002 albums
Albums produced by Wayne Kramer (guitarist)